Kilkenny City was a constituency represented in the Irish House of Commons until 1800.

History
In the Patriot Parliament of 1689 summoned by James II, Kilkenny City was represented with two members.

Members of Parliament
 1374 William de Karlell
 1374 John de Karlell
 1450 John Chevir
 1560 Robert Shee and Walter Archer
 1585 John Rothe of Rothe House and Ellice Shee
 1613–1615 Patrick Archer and Nicholas Langton
 1634–1635 Robert Shee and David Rothe
 1639–1649 Peter Rothe and Henry Archer
 1661–1666 Abel Warren (expelled and replaced 1665 by Sir Thomas Longville) and Thomas Evans

1689–1801

Notes

References

Bibliography

Constituencies of the Parliament of Ireland (pre-1801)
Historic constituencies in County Kilkenny
1800 disestablishments in Ireland
Constituencies disestablished in 1800
Kilkenny (city)